Harry Kirtley (23 May 1930 – 13 December 2007) was an English footballer who played in The Football League for Sunderland, Cardiff City and Gateshead.

Club career
Kirtley made his debut for Sunderland on 16 April 1949 in a 1–1 tie against Manchester City at Maine Road. In his career at Sunderland, he made 101 appearances and scored 18 goals during 1948 to 1955. From Sunderland he moved to Cardiff City where he scored 4 goals in 38 appearances in one season. He then returned to the North East with Gateshead, he played 96 times and scored 14 goals up to leaving in 1960. He had a short stint with Welsh side Rhyl before retiring, and settled in Rhyl afterwards.

Kirtley died in 2007 and current chairman of Sunderland, Niall Quinn, said "It's always very sad when we lose a member of our Sunderland family."

References

1930 births
2007 deaths
English footballers
Sunderland A.F.C. players
Cardiff City F.C. players
Gateshead F.C. players
Rhyl F.C. players
English Football League players
Association football inside forwards